Atreyapuram is a village in Konaseema district of Indian state of Andhra Pradesh. It is located in Atreyapuram Mandal of Amalapuram revenue division of the district.

Popularity 
The village is known for the popular Indian sweet pootharekulu.

References 

Villages in Atreyapuram mandal

External links
 Pootharekulu
 Atreyapuram-Pootharekulu-making
 Pootharekulu-history